Aspergillus aurantiopurpureus is a species of fungus in the genus Aspergillus. It is from the Nidulantes section. The species was first described in 2016. It has been isolated from a kangaroo rat cheek pouch in New Mexico, United States.

Growth and morphology

A. aurantiopurpureus has been cultivated on both Czapek yeast extract agar (CYA) plates and Malt Extract Agar Oxoid® (MEAOX) plates. The growth morphology of the colonies can be seen in the pictures below.

References 

aurantiopurpureus
Fungi described in 2016